Formoso is a municipality in north Goiás state, Brazil. The population was 4,172 (2020) in a total area of 844 km².
  
Highway connections from Goiânia are made by GO-080 / Nerópolis / São Francisco de Goiás / BR-153 / Jaraguá / GO-080 / Goianésia / Barro Alto / GO-342 / BR-080 / BR-153 / Uruaçu / Santa Tereza de Goiás / GO-241.

Formoso is surrounded by the following municipalities: 
north:  Santa Tereza de Goiás and Trombas
east:  Campinorte and Minaçu
west:  Estrela do Norte 
south:  Campinorte and Mara Rosa

The economy is based on livestock raising, modest agriculture, small commerce, and government services.  There was one bank in 2007.  
The main agricultural activities were cattle raising: 50,000 head (2006) and  the growing of rice, sugarcane, manioc, corn, and banana (all fewer than 1,000 hectares).  In 2006 there were 605 farms with 2,114 hectares of planted area.  Pasture land made up 45,700 hectares.  Approximately 2,000 people were employed in agriculture.  Statistics are from IBGE

The literacy rate was 84.0% (2000) and the infant mortality rate was 24.07 in 1,000 live births.  There were 7 schools and 1 hospital with 18 beds.  The score on the Municipal Human Development Index was  0.737.
State ranking:  119 (out of 242 municipalities in 2000)
National ranking:  2,250 (out of 5,507 municipalities in 2000)

See also
 List of municipalities in Goiás

References

Frigoletto

Municipalities in Goiás